Aristolochia littoralis, the calico flower or مورپنکھ بیل or elegant Dutchman's pipe, is a species of evergreen vine belonging to the family Aristolochiaceae.

Etymology
The scientific name Aristolochia was developed from Ancient Greek aristos (άριστος) "best" + locheia (λοχεία), "childbirth" or "childbed", as in ancient times the plant was thought to be effective against infections caused by childbirth. The species Latin name littoralis means “coastal”.

Description
Flowers are heart-shaped, greenish yellow with intricate purplish-brown markings. The inner surface of the flared mouth is completely purplish-brown. The flowering period extends through all summer. These plants are pollinated by flies which are attracted by the unpleasant carrion-like odor produced by the flowers. The numerous winged seeds are borne in dry dehiscent capsules that split like small parachutes. As the seeds are winged they are easily dispersed by wind. Plants in the related genus Pararistolochia differ by having fleshy moist fruit that do not split. This plant contains aristolochic acid, a toxic alkaloid.

Distribution
The vining plant is native to southern and western South America. It is found in: 
Brazil in Ceara, Mato Grosso, Mato Grosso do Sul, Minas Gerais, Parana, Rio de Janeiro, Rondonia, Santa Catarina, and São Paulo states.
Argentina in Corrientes, Entre Rios, Jujuy, Misiones, and Santa Fe Provinces.
Paraguay in Amambay, Central, Concepcion, Cordillera, Paraguari, and San Pedro Departments.
Bolivia, Colombia, Ecuador, and Peru.

It is an invasive species in Australia and in the southern United States. In Australia it is fatal to the caterpillars of two butterflies, the Cairns birdwing (Ornithoptera euphorion) and of the threatened Richmond birdwing (O. richmondia), and threatens to displace their proper host plant, A. tagala.

Habitat
Aristolochia littoralis prefers acid-neutral soils (pH 5.5 – 7.0) and average moisture, in part sun to shade, at an elevation of about

Cultivation
This subtropical plant requires a minimum temperature of 7 °C, and in temperate regions is grown under glass. It has gained the Royal Horticultural Society's Award of Garden Merit.

Gallery

References

 Forest Starr, Kim Starr, and Lloyd Loope Aristolochia littoralis
 
 Floridata

External links
 Plants
 Plants of Hawaii
 Toptropicals
 

littoralis
Flora of Brazil
Flora of southern South America
Flora of western South America
Garden plants of South America
Vines